Urie is a census-designated place in Uinta County, Wyoming, United States. The population was 262 at the 2010 census. The main roads that run through the community are Interstate 80 Business Loop and Wyoming Highway 414.

See also

 List of census-designated places in Wyoming

References

External links

Census-designated places in Wyoming
Census-designated places in Uinta County, Wyoming